Alumina Partners of Jamaica, also known as Alpart, is a company that owns and operates a bauxite refinery in Nain, Jamaica. Alpart was founded in 1969 as a joint venture by Kaiser Aluminum, Reynolds Aluminum, and Anaconda. Alpart exports 1.65 million tonnes of  alumina overseas per year, and earned gross revenues of US$1.3 billion in 2007. As of 2011, previous partner Hydro divested its 35% stake to Rusal which assumed 100% stake in Alpart, wholly owned by RusAl the refinery has paused operations due to the company's alumina product experiencing a drastic 60 per cent price reversal since July 2008 with the temporary shutdown allowing the plant to be prepared for future developments that may see the industry emerging from the economic downturns it has faced.

In 2016, UC Rusal sold 100% stake of the Alumina Partners of Jamaica (‘Alpart’)  to the Chinese state industrial group, Jiuquan Iron & Steel (Group) Co. Ltd. (‘JISCO’).

References

Joint ventures
Saint Elizabeth Parish
Aluminium companies of Jamaica
Rusal

alpart